Battle of Northampton may refer to:

Battle of Northampton (1264)
Battle of Northampton (1460)